I Want Some is a compilation album by The Make-Up.  I Want Some collects 23 of The Make-Up's singles and B-sides. It was released as a double LP, and as a CD version that included an 11-page booklet.

Track #20, "Wade in the Water," is a cover of a traditional African-American spiritual song of the same name.

Track listing 

"Pow! To the People" − 3:03
"I Want Some" − 2:43
"Walking on the Dune" − 3:34
"The Choice" − 3:33
"Born on the Floor" − 4:25
"Hey! Orpheus" − 2:28
"Grey Motorcycle" − 3:17
"Every Baby Cries the Same" − 4:20
"I am if..." − 4:00
"Little Black Book" − 3:46
"Blue Is Beautiful" − 3:36
"Trans-Pleasant Express" − 2:15
"Type-U Blood − 3:13
"We're Having a Baby" − 1:54
"This is ... Young Vulgarians" − 1:58
"R U A Believer" − 1:47
"Free Arthur Lee" − 3:02
"Untouchable Sound" − 1:56
"I Didn't Mean 2 Turn U On" − 2:29
"Wade in the Water" − 2:43
"Substance Abuse" − 2:30
"Under the Impression" − 2:37
"Have U Heard the Tapes?" − 3:06

Sample

References

The Make-Up albums
1999 compilation albums